In mathematics, the Bolza surface, alternatively, complex algebraic Bolza curve (introduced by ), is a compact Riemann surface of genus  with the highest possible order of the conformal automorphism group in this genus, namely  of order 48 (the general linear group of  matrices over the finite field ). The full automorphism group (including reflections) is the semi-direct product  of order 96. An affine model for the Bolza surface can be obtained as the locus of the equation

The Bolza surface is the smooth completion of the affine curve. Of all genus  hyperbolic surfaces, the Bolza surface maximizes the length of the systole . As a hyperelliptic Riemann surface, it arises as the ramified double cover of the Riemann sphere, with ramification locus at the six vertices of a regular octahedron inscribed in the sphere, as can be readily seen from the equation above.

The Bolza surface has attracted the attention of physicists, as it provides a relatively simple model for quantum chaos; in this context, it is usually referred to as the Hadamard–Gutzwiller model. The spectral theory of the Laplace–Beltrami operator acting on functions on the Bolza surface is of interest to both mathematicians and physicists, since the surface is conjectured to maximize the first positive eigenvalue of the Laplacian among all compact, closed Riemann surfaces of genus  with constant negative curvature.

Triangle surface

The Bolza surface is a  triangle surface – see Schwarz triangle. More specifically, the Fuchsian group defining the Bolza surface is a subgroup of the group generated by reflections in the sides of a hyperbolic triangle with angles . The Fuchsian group  defining the Bolza surface is also a subgroup of the (3,3,4) triangle group, which is a subgroup of index 2 in the  triangle group. The  group does not have a realization in terms of a quaternion algebra, but the  group does.

where . Opposite sides of the octagon are identified under the action of the Fuchsian group. Its generators are the matrices

The generators satisfy the relation

These generators are connected to the length spectrum, which gives all of the possible lengths of geodesic loops.  The shortest such length is called the systole of the surface.  The systole of the Bolza surface is

The  element  of the length spectrum for the Bolza surface is given by

where  runs through the positive integers (but omitting 4, 24, 48, 72, 140, and various higher values)  and where  is the unique odd integer that minimizes

It is possible to obtain an equivalent closed form of the systole directly from the triangle group. Formulae exist to calculate the side lengths of a (2,3,8) triangles explicitly. The systole is equal to four times the length of the side of medial length in a (2,3,8) triangle, that is,

The geodesic lengths  also appear in the Fenchel–Nielsen coordinates of the surface.

There is also a "symmetric" set of coordinates , where all three of the lengths are the systole  and all three of the twists
are given by

Symmetries of the surface

The fundamental domain of the Bolza surface is a regular octagon in the Poincaré disk; the four symmetric actions that generate the (full) symmetry group are:
R – rotation of order 8 about the centre of the octagon;
S – reflection in the real line;
T – reflection in the side of one of the 16 (4,4,4) triangles that tessellate the octagon;
U – rotation of order 3 about the centre of a (4,4,4) triangle.
These are shown by the bold lines in the adjacent figure. They satisfy the following set of relations:

 

where  is the trivial (identity) action. One may use this set of relations in GAP to retrieve information about the representation theory of the group. In particular, there are four 1-dimensional, two 2-dimensional, four 3-dimensional, and three 4-dimensional irreducible representations, and

as expected.

Spectral theory

Here, spectral theory refers to the spectrum of the Laplacian, . The first eigenspace (that is, the eigenspace corresponding to the first positive eigenvalue) of the Bolza surface is three-dimensional, and the second, four-dimensional , . It is thought that investigating perturbations of the nodal lines of functions in the first eigenspace in Teichmüller space will yield the conjectured result in the introduction. This conjecture is based on extensive numerical computations of eigenvalues of the surface and other surfaces of genus 2. In particular, the spectrum of the Bolza surface is known to a very high accuracy . The following table gives the first ten positive eigenvalues of the Bolza surface.

The spectral determinant and Casimir energy  of the Bolza surface are

and

respectively, where all decimal places are believed to be correct. It is conjectured that the spectral determinant is maximized in genus 2 for the Bolza surface.

Quaternion algebra

Following MacLachlan and Reid, the quaternion algebra can be taken to be the algebra over  generated as an associative algebra by generators i,j and relations 

with an appropriate choice of an order.

See also
Hyperelliptic curve
Klein quartic
Bring's curve
Macbeath surface
First Hurwitz triplet

References

Specific

Riemann surfaces
Systolic geometry